Young Christian Democrats (JKD) is the youth organization in Lithuania. JKD (Jaunieji Krikscionys Demokratai) was founded in 1993 as a non-governmental organization and unites more than 1,000 young people in 30 branches in different districts of Lithuania as well as abroad. JKD members are active members of our community – political scientists, doctors, politicians, teachers, students, journalists, construction workers, farmers, etc., ages 16 through 35.  Chairperson - Goda Karazijaitė.

Mission 

To carry out the youth politics with an important stress on social security, human dignity and Christian Democratic values.

Values 

JKD Primary values are:

• a free individual with a strong feeling of responsibility

• legal equality

• justice

• solidarity

Young Christian Democrats think that our society should be grounded in fundamental family values; each member of the society must have the freedom of personal initiative and a strong feeling of responsibility.

International activities 
JKD is one of the founding members of YEPP (Youth of the European People's Party) and had the member of the Board in this organization for 4 years. Dozens of international projects together with Belarusian, Czech, Danish, Dutch, Estonian, Georgian, German, Latvian, Norwegian, Russian, Swedish and Ukrainian partners were carried out. JKD work closely with Konrad Adenauer and Eduardo Frei Foundations.

External links 
 

Political organizations based in Lithuania
Youth organizations based in Lithuania
Organizations based in Vilnius